The 2019–20 Golden State Warriors season was the 74th season of the franchise in the National Basketball Association (NBA), and its 58th in the San Francisco Bay Area. The Warriors entered the season as runners-up in the 2019 NBA Finals, where they lost to the Toronto Raptors in six games. The Warriors moved from the Oracle Arena (now Oakland Arena) in Oakland to the new Chase Center in San Francisco before the start of the season, the first time the team had played in the city since the 1970–71 season.

This season saw the departures of Kevin Durant and Andre Iguodala, and thus the break up of the Hamptons Five. After considering signing with teams such as the New York Knicks and Los Angeles Clippers, Durant left in a sign-and-trade with the Brooklyn Nets, with the Golden State Warriors acquiring All-Star guard D'Angelo Russell as part of the deal. Iguodala was traded to the Memphis Grizzlies after six seasons with the Warriors, in which he won three championships and a Finals MVP. Russell would then be traded to the Minnesota Timberwolves for former #1 pick Andrew Wiggins at the trade deadline in February 2020.

Despite lofty expectations, the Warriors got off to a 4–16 start, their worst since the 2000 season. Injuries were a major reason for the poor start. All-Star SG Klay Thompson missed the entire regular season with an ACL tear he suffered during Game 6 of the 2019 NBA Finals. Stephen Curry was injured on October 30, 2019, which required surgery to repair his broken second metacarpal. Curry played in just five of the Warriors' 65 games.

With their 33rd loss against the Dallas Mavericks on January 14, 2020, the Warriors failed to reach 50 wins for the first time since 2013. From the end of December to the middle of January, the team suffered a 10-game losing streak, the first time they have lost 10 games in a row since 2002. They also suffered their first losing season since 2012 following their 42nd loss to the Miami Heat. With their March 10 loss to the Los Angeles Clippers, the Warriors were eliminated from the playoffs for the first time since 2012 and missed the NBA Finals for the first time since 2014, ending five consecutive Finals appearances.

In response to mounting concerns over the COVID-19 pandemic by public health officials, the season was suspended by the league officials following the games of March 11 after it was reported that then Utah Jazz center Rudy Gobert tested positive for COVID-19. This came after the Warriors announced that their game against the Brooklyn Nets the next day would be played behind closed doors.  On June 4, 2020, it was announced by the NBA Board of Governors approved a plan that would restart the season with 22 teams returning to play in the NBA Bubble on July 31, 2020, which was approved by the National Basketball Players Association (NBPA) the next day. The Warriors, with the league's worst record at the time of the season's suspension, were not among them, effectively ending the team's season.

Draft

The Warriors held one first-round pick and two second round draft picks entering the draft. The 58th pick was traded to the Utah Jazz for cash considerations.

Standings

Division

Conference

Game log

Regular season

|- style="background:#fcc;"
| 1
| October 24
| L. A. Clippers
| 
| Stephen Curry (23)
| Kevon Looney (9)
| D'Angelo Russell (8)
| Chase Center18,064
| 0–1
|- style="background:#fcc;"
| 2
| October 27
| @ Oklahoma City
| 
| Stephen Curry (23)
| Curry, Spellman (8)
| Stephen Curry (5)
| Chesapeake Energy Arena18,203
| 0–2
|- style="background:#cfc;"
| 3
| October 28
| @ New Orleans
| 
| Stephen Curry (26)
| Draymond Green (17)
| Stephen Curry (11)
| Smoothie King Center17,307
| 1–2
|- style="background:#fcc;"
| 4
| October 30
| Phoenix
| 
| Eric Paschall (20)
| Green, Russell, Spellman (6)
| Stephen Curry (6)
| Chase Center18,064
| 1–3

|- style="background:#fcc;"
| 5
| November 1
| San Antonio
| 
| D'Angelo Russell (30)
| Marquese Chriss (9)
| D'Angelo Russell (8)
| Chase Center18,064
| 1–4
|- style="background:#fcc;"
| 6
| November 2
| Charlotte
| 
| Eric Paschall (25)
| Cauley-Stein, Robinson III (8)
| Ky Bowman (4)
| Chase Center18,064
| 1–5
|- style="background:#cfc;"
| 7
| November 4
| Portland
| 
| Eric Paschall (34)
| Eric Paschall (13)
| Ky Bowman (8)
| Chase Center18,064
| 2–5
|- style="background:#fcc;"
| 8
| November 6
| @ Houston
| 
| Alec Burks (28)
| Glenn Robinson III (11)
| Ky Bowman (4)
| Toyota Center18,055
| 2–6
|- style="background:#fcc;"
| 9
| November 8
| @ Minnesota
| 
| D'Angelo Russell (52)
| Burks, Russell (9)
| D'Angelo Russell (5)
| Target Center15,647
| 2–7
|- style="background:#fcc;"
| 10
| November 9
| @ Oklahoma City
| 
| D'Angelo Russell (30)
| Damion Lee (7)
| D'Angelo Russell (7)
| Chesapeake Energy Arena18,203
| 2–8
|- style="background:#fcc;"
| 11
| November 11
| Utah
| 
| D'Angelo Russell (33)
| Willie Cauley-Stein (11)
| D'Angelo Russell (8)
| Chase Center18,064
| 2–9
|- style="background:#fcc;"
| 12
| November 13
| @ L. A. Lakers
| 
| D'Angelo Russell (21)
| Omari Spellman (7)
| D'Angelo Russell (8)
| Staples Center18,997
| 2–10
|- style="background:#fcc;"
| 13
| November 15
| Boston
| 
| Alec Burks (20)
| Draymond Green (11)
| D'Angelo Russell (7)
| Chase Center18,064
| 2–11
|- style="background:#fcc;"
| 14
| November 17
| @ New Orleans
| 
| Eric Paschall (30)
| Chriss, Paschall (7)
| Alec Burks (5)
| Smoothie King Center16,812
| 2–12
|- style="background:#cfc;"
| 15
| November 19
| @ Memphis
| 
| Alec Burks (29)
| Cauley-Stein, Green (10)
| Draymond Green (11)
| FedExForum14,511
| 3–12
|- style="background:#fcc;"
| 16
| November 20
| @ Dallas
| 
| Eric Paschall (22)
| Eric Paschall (7)
| Jordan Poole (7)
| American Airlines Center19,569
| 3–13
|- style="background:#fcc;"
| 17
| November 22
| @ Utah
| 
| Alec Burks (20)
| Eric Paschall (7)
| Bowman, Paschall, Robinson III (5)
| Vivint Smart Home Arena18,306
| 3–14
|- style="background:#fcc;"
| 18
| November 25
| Oklahoma City
| 
| Glenn Robinson III (25)
| Eric Paschall (10)
| Marquese Chriss (7)
| Chase Center18,064
| 3–15
|- style="background:#cfc;"
| 19
| November 27
| Chicago
| 
| Eric Paschall (25)
| Omari Spellman (11)
| Draymond Green (8)
| Chase Center18,064
| 4–15
|- style="background:#fcc;"
| 20
| November 29
| @ Miami
| 
| Jordan Poole (20)
| Ky Bowman (7)
| Bowman, Chriss (6)
| American Airlines Arena19,600
| 4–16

|- style="background:#fcc;"
| 21
| December 1
| @ Orlando
| 
| Glenn Robinson III (19)
| Willie Cauley-Stein (12)
| Draymond Green (7)
| Amway Center15,052
| 4–17
|- style="background:#fcc;"
| 22
| December 2
| @ Atlanta
| 
| Eric Paschall (24)
| Paschall, Spellman (9)
| Eric Paschall (6)
| State Farm Arena14,278
| 4–18
|- style="background:#fcc;"
| 23
| December 4
| @ Charlotte
| 
| D'Angelo Russell (18)
| Willie Cauley-Stein (7)
| Draymond Green (6)
| Spectrum Center14,355
| 4–19
|- style="background:#cfc;"
| 24
| December 6
| @ Chicago
| 
| Glenn Robinson III (20)
| Cauley-Stein, Robinson III, Russell (7)
| Ky Bowman (6)
| United Center18,841
| 5–19
|- style="background:#fcc;"
| 25
| December 9
| Memphis
| 
| Burks, Russell (18)
| Cauley-Stein, Robinson III (8)
| D'Angelo Russell (7)
| Chase Center18,064
| 5–20
|- style="background:#fcc;"
| 26
| December 11
| New York
| 
| D'Angelo Russell (32)
| Chriss, Green (10)
| Draymond Green (12)
| Chase Center18,064
| 5–21
|- style="background:#fcc;"
| 27
| December 13
| @ Utah
| 
| Alec Burks (24)
| Marquese Chriss (13)
| Marquese Chriss (5)
| Vivint Smart Home Arena18,306
| 5–22
|- style="background:#fcc;"
| 28
| December 15
| Sacramento
| 
| Willie Cauley-Stein (14)
| Marquese Chriss (6)
| D'Angelo Russell (8)
| Chase Center18,064
| 5–23
|- style="background:#fcc;"
| 29
| December 18
| @ Portland
| 
| D'Angelo Russell (26)
| Marquese Chriss (10)
| D'Angelo Russell (7)
| Moda Center19,393
| 5–24
|- style="background:#cfc;"
| 30
| December 20
| New Orleans
| 
| D'Angelo Russell (25)
| Alec Burks (8)
| Draymond Green (8)
| Chase Center18,064
| 6–24
|- style="background:#cfc;"
| 31
| December 23
| Minnesota
| 
| D'Angelo Russell (30)
| Draymond Green (14)
| Alec Burks (8)
| Chase Center18,064
| 7–24
|- style="background:#cfc;"
| 32
| December 25
| Houston
| 
| Damion Lee (22)
| Damion Lee (15)
| Ky Bowman (6)
| Chase Center18,064
| 8–24
|- style="background:#cfc;"
| 33
| December 27
| Phoenix
| 
| D'Angelo Russell (31)
| Damion Lee (8)
| D'Angelo Russell (6)
| Chase Center18,064
| 9–24
|- style="background:#fcc;"
| 34
| December 28
| Dallas
| 
| D'Angelo Russell (35)
| Damion Lee (12)
| Draymond Green (8)
| Chase Center18,064
| 9–25
|- style="background:#fcc;"
| 35
| December 31
| @ San Antonio
| 
| Alec Burks (28)
| Marquese Chriss (11)
| Draymond Green (9)
| AT&T Center18,354
| 9–26

|- style="background:#fcc;"
| 36
| January 2
| @ Minnesota
| 
| Glenn Robinson III (16)
| Paschall, Chriss (7)
| Draymond Green (6)
| Target Center15,477
| 9–27
|- style="background:#fcc;"
| 37
| January 4
| Detroit
| 
| Alec Burks (27)
| Alec Burks (7)
| Alec Burks (5)
| Chase Center18,064
| 9–28
|- style="background:#fcc;"
| 38
| January 6
| @ Sacramento
| 
| Glenn Robinson III (16)
| Willie Cauley-Stein (9)
| Willie Cauley-Stein (5)
| Golden 1 Center15,819
| 9–29
|- style="background:#fcc;"
| 39
| January 8
| Milwaukee
| 
| Alec Burks (19)
| Willie Cauley-Stein (11)
| Draymond Green (8)
| Chase Center18,064
| 9–30
|- style="background:#fcc;"
| 40
| January 10
| @ L. A. Clippers
| 
| Robinson III, Spellman (17)
| Alec Burks (8)
| Burks, Lee (5)
| Staples Center19,068
| 9–31
|- style="background:#fcc;"
| 41
| January 12
| @ Memphis
| 
| D'Angelo Russell (34)
| Draymond Green (8)
| Eric Paschall (5)
| FedExForum16,408
| 9–32
|- style="background:#fcc;"
| 42
| January 14
| Dallas
| 
| Jacob Evans (17)
| Glenn Robinson III (7)
| D'Angelo Russell (8)
| Chase Center18,064
| 9–33
|- style="background:#fcc;"
| 43
| January 16
| Denver
| 
| Alec Burks (25)
| Draymond Green (8)
| D'Angelo Russell (9)
| Chase Center18,064
| 9–34
|- style="background:#cfc;"
| 44
| January 18
| Orlando
| 
| D'Angelo Russell (26)
| Eric Paschall (9)
| D'Angelo Russell (12)
| Chase Center18,064
| 10–34
|- style="background:#fcc;"
| 45
| January 20
| @ Portland
| 
| Alec Burks (33)
| Eric Paschall (13)
| D'Angelo Russell (9)
| Moda Center19,493
| 10–35
|- style="background:#fcc;"
| 46
| January 22
| Utah
| 
| D'Angelo Russell (26)
| Marquese Chriss (8)
| Damion Lee (4)
| Chase Center18,064
| 10–36
|- style="background:#fcc;"
| 47
| January 24
| Indiana
| 
| D'Angelo Russell (37)
| Paschall, Robinson III (7)
| Draymond Green (11)
| Chase Center18,064
| 10–37
|- style="background:#fcc;"
| 48
| January 28
| @ Philadelphia
| 
| D'Angelo Russell (28)
| Draymond Green (9)
| Draymond Green (12)
| Wells Fargo Center20,854
| 10–38
|- style="background:#fcc;"
| 49
| January 30
| @ Boston
| 
| D'Angelo Russell (22)
| Damion Lee (7)
| Draymond Green (7)
| TD Garden19,156
| 10–39

|- style="background:#cfc;"
| 50
| February 1
| @ Cleveland
| 
| Glenn Robinson III (22)
| Chriss, Green, Russell (7)
| Draymond Green (16)
| Rocket Mortgage FieldHouse18,410
| 11–39
|- style="background:#cfc;"
| 51
| February 3
| @ Washington
| 
| Alec Burks (30)
| Green, Paschall (10)
| Green, Robinson III (7)
| Capital One Arena17,120
| 12–39
|- style="background:#fcc;"
| 52
| February 5
| @ Brooklyn
| 
| D'Angelo Russell (17)
| Marquese Chriss (7)
| Evans, Poole (4)
| Barclays Center14,352
| 12–40
|- style="background:#fcc;"
| 53
| February 8
| L. A. Lakers
| 
| Marquese Chriss (26)
| Marquese Chriss (9)
| Ky Bowman (11)
| Chase Center18,064
| 12–41
|- style="background:#fcc;"
| 54
| February 10
| Miami
| 
| Damion Lee (26)
| Chriss, Green (9)
| Draymond Green (9)
| Chase Center18,064
| 12–42
|- style="background:#fcc;"
| 55
| February 12
| @ Phoenix
| 
| Andrew Wiggins (27)
| Marquese Chriss (12)
| Draymond Green (9)
| Talking Stick Resort Arena15,216
| 12–43
|- style="background:#fcc;"
| 56
| February 20
| Houston
| 
| Andrew Wiggins (22)
| Paschall, Toscano-Anderson (7)
| Draymond Green (7)
| Chase Center18,064
| 12–44
|- style="background:#fcc;"
| 57
| February 23
| New Orleans
| 
| Damion Lee (22)
| Andrew Wiggins (9)
| Ky Bowman (7)
| Chase Center18,064
| 12–45
|- style="background:#fcc;"
| 58
| February 25
| Sacramento
| 
| Marquese Chriss (21)
| Marquese Chriss (10)
| Lee, Poole (4)
| Chase Center18,064
| 12–46
|- style="background:#fcc;"
| 59
| February 27
| L. A. Lakers
| 
| Eric Paschall (23)
| Marquese Chriss (7)
| Jordan Poole (8)
| Chase Center18,064
| 12–47
|- style="background:#cfc;"
| 60
| February 29
| @ Phoenix
| 
| Eric Paschall (25)
| Bender, Chriss (9)
| Damion Lee (8)
| Talking Stick Resort Arena16,395
| 13–47

|- style="background:#fcc;"
| 61
| March 1
| Washington
| 
| Andrew Wiggins (27)
| Marquese Chriss (13)
| Jordan Poole (7)
| Chase Center18,064
| 13–48
|- style="background:#cfc;"
| 62
| March 3
| @ Denver
| 
| Paschall, Wiggins (22)
| 5 tied (5)
| Andrew Wiggins (10)
| Pepsi Center19,520
| 14–48
|- style="background:#fcc;"
| 63
| March 5
| Toronto
| 
| Curry, Lee (23)
| Marquese Chriss (12)
| Eric Paschall (8)
| Chase Center18,064
| 14–49
|- style="background:#cfc;"
| 64
| March 7
| Philadelphia
| 
| Damion Lee (24)
| Marquese Chriss (10)
| Marquese Chriss (8)
| Chase Center18,064
| 15–49
|- style="background:#fcc;"
| 65
| March 10
| L. A. Clippers
| 
| Dragan Bender (23)
| Marquese Chriss (10)
| Eric Paschall (7)
| Chase Center18,064
| 15–50

|- style="background:#;"
| 66
| March 12
| Brooklyn
| 
|
|
|
| Chase Center
|
|- style="background:#;"
| 67
| March 14
| @ Milwaukee
| 
|
|
|
| Fiserv Forum
|
|- style="background:#;"
| 68
| March 16
| @ Toronto
| 
|
|
|
| Scotiabank Arena
|
|- style="background:#;"
| 69
| March 18
| @ Indiana
| 
|
|
|
| Bankers Life Fieldhouse
|
|- style="background:#;"
| 70
| March 20
| @ Detroit
| 
|
|
|
| Little Caesars Arena
|
|- style="background:#;"
| 71
| March 21
| @ New York
| 
|
|
|
| Madison Square Garden
|
|- style="background:#;"
| 72
| March 25
| Atlanta
| 
|
|
|
| Chase Center
|
|- style="background:#;"
| 73
| March 28
| Oklahoma City
| 
|
|
|
| Chase Center
|
|- style="background:#;"
| 74
| March 29
| San Antonio
| 
|
|
|
| Chase Center
|
|- style="background:#;"
| 75
| March 31
| Denver
| 
|
|
|
| Chase Center
|
|- style="background:#;"
| 76
| April 2
| @ Houston
| 
|
|
|
| Toyota Center
|
|- style="background:#;"
| 77
| April 3
| @ San Antonio
| 
|
|
|
| AT&T Center
|
|- style="background:#;"
| 78
| April 7
| @ LA Lakers
| 
|
|
|
| Staples Center
|
|- style="background:#;"
| 79
| April 8
| Cleveland
| 
|
|
|
| Chase Center
|
|- style="background:#;"
| 80
| April 11
| @ LA Clippers
| 
|
|
|
| Staples Center
|
|- style="background:#;"
| 81
| April 13
| Portland
| 
|
|
|
| Chase Center
|
|- style="background:#;"
| 82
| April 15
| @ Sacramento
| 
|
|
|
| Golden 1 Center
|

Roster

Player statistics

Regular season

|
| 5 || 5 || 27.8 || .402 || .245 || 1.000 || 5.2 || 6.6 || 1.0 || .4 || 20.8
|-
|
| 60 || 26 || 27.6 || .497 || .287 || .774 || 4.6 || 2.1 || .5 || .2 || 14.0
|-
|
| 49 || 36 || 29.0 || .417 || .356 || .873 || 4.9 || 2.7 || 1.0 || .1 || 12.7
|-
|
| 59 || 21 || 20.3 || .545 || .205 || .769 || 6.2 || 1.9 || .7 || 1.1 || 9.3
|-
|
| 57 || 14 || 22.4 || .333 || .279 || .798 || 2.1 || 2.4 || .6 || .2 || 8.8
|-
|
| 43 || 43 || 28.4 || .389 || .279 || .759 || 6.2 || 6.2 || 1.4 || .8 || 8.0
|-
|
| 45 || 12 || 22.6 || .417 || .308 || .829 || 2.7 || 2.9 || 1.0 || .2 || 7.4
|-
|
| 14 || 0 || 9.9 || .500 || .231 || .842 || 1.9 || .9 || .2 || .3 || 4.2
|-
|
| 20 || 4 || 13.1 || .367 || .071 || .750 || 3.3 || 1.0 || .6 || .3 || 3.4
|-
| ≠
| 12 || 12 || 33.6 || .457 || .339 || .672 || 4.6 || 3.6 || 1.3 || 1.4 || 19.4
|-
| ≠
| 7 || 3 || 29.1 || .388 || .308 || .750 || 3.3 || 1.1 || .3 || .1 || 11.0
|-
| ≠
| 9 || 3 || 21.7 || .437 || .324 || .727 || 5.9 || 2.1 || .4 || .4 || 9.0
|-
| ≠
| 3 || 0 || 14.7 || .500 || .429 || .000 || 1.0 || 2.7 || .3 || .0 || 8.3
|-
| ≠
| 13 || 6 || 20.9 || .460 || .348 || .600 || 4.0 || 2.0 || 1.0 || .4 || 5.3
|-
| ≠
| 3 || 0 || 12.0 || .273 || .375 || 1.000 || 1.7 || 1.0 || .7 || .0 || 3.3
|-
| ≠
| 3 || 0 || 13.3 || .000 || .000 || .833 || .7 || 1.7 || .7 || .0 || 1.7
|-
| †
| 33 || 33 || 32.1 || .430 || .374 || .785 || 3.7 || 6.2 || .9 || .3 || 23.6
|-
| †
| 48 || 18 || 29.0 || .406 || .375 || .897 || 4.7 || 3.1 || 1.0 || .4 || 16.1
|-
| †
| 48 || 48 || 31.6 || .481 || .400 || .851 || 4.7 || 1.8 || .9 || .3 || 12.9
|-
| †
| 41 || 37 || 23.0 || .560 || — || .614 || 6.2 || 1.5 || 1.1 || 1.2 || 7.9
|-
| †
| 49 || 3 || 18.1 || .431 || .391 || .793 || 4.5 || 1.0 || .7 || .5 || 7.6
|-
| †
| 27 || 1 || 15.3 || .338 || .342 || .862 || 1.5 || 1.1 || .4 || .4 || 4.7
|}
After all games.
‡ Waived during the season
† Traded during the season
≠ Acquired during the season

Transactions

Trades

Free Agency

Re-signed

Additions

Subtractions

Awards

Notes

References

Golden State Warriors seasons
Golden State Warriors
Golden State Warriors
Golden State Warriors